Subaru has designed, assembled and/or sold the following vehicles:

Current models

Former models
 360/460 (1958–1971)
 1000 (1966–1969)
 1500 (1954)
 Alcyone/SVX (1991–1996)
 Baja (2003–2006)
 BRAT/Brumby/MV (1978–1994)
 Dex (2006–2012, rebadged Daihatsu Materia)
 FF-1 G (1971–1972)
 FF-1 Star (1969–1973)
 Exiga (2008–2018)
 Leone (1971–1994) Third generation van version was sold by Isuzu as the Isuzu Geminett II (1989-1993)
 Lucra (2010–2015, rebadged Daihatsu Tanto Exe)
 Outback Sport/Gravel Express/RV (1994–2012)
 R-2 (1969–1972)
 R1 (2005–2010)
 R2 (2003–2010)
 Rex (kei car) (1972–1992)
 Sumo/Libera/Domingo/Columbuss/E series/Estratto (1983–1998)
 Traviq (1999–2005, rebadged Opel Zafira)
 Trezia (2010–2016, rebadged Toyota Ractis)
 Tribeca (2005–2014)
 Vivio (1992–1998)
 XT/Alcyone XT/Vortex (1985–1991)

Concepts
 Subaru ACX-II (1985, based on the Alcyone; entered production as the XT6)
 Subaru F-9X (1985)
 Subaru BLT (1987)
 Subaru F-624 Estremo (1987)
 Subaru Jo-Car (1987)
 Subaru SVX (1989, entered production as the Alcyone SVX)
 Subaru SRD-1 (Experimental design study introduced in 1990)
 Subaru Amadeus (1991, shooting-brake version of the SVX)
 Subaru CM1 (1991)
 Subaru Hanako (1991)
 Subaru Rioma (1991)
 Subaru Jusmin (1993)
 Subaru Sagres (1993)
 Subaru Suiren (1993, concept replacement for the BRAT/Brumby) 
 Subaru Alpha-Exiga (1995)
 Subaru Elcapa (1995)
 Subaru Streega (1995, entered production as the Forester)
 Subaru Exiga (1996, wagon)
 Subaru Elten (1997)
 Subaru Elten Custom (1999)
 Subaru Fleet-X (1999)
 Subaru ST-X (2000)
 Subaru HM-01 (2001)
 Subaru WX-01 (2001)
 Subaru B11S (2003)
 Subaru B9 Scrambler (2003)
 Subaru R1e (2003)
 Subaru B5 TPH (2005, Turbo Parallel Hybrid) (Japanese: Subaru B5-TPH)
 Subaru G4e (2007)
 Subaru Hybrid & Advanced Tourer (2009, 2011)
 Subaru VIZIV (2013-2019)
 Subaru STI E-RA (2022)
 Subaru HS500

References

External links

Subaru vehicles
Subaru